The House may refer to:

In arts and entertainment

In film and television
 The House (1975 film), a Yugoslav film
 The House (1983 film), an Icelandic film
 The House (1997 film), a Lithuanian film
 The House (1999 film), a Chinese film directed by Wang Xiaoshuai
 The House (2011 film), a Slovak/Czech drama film directed by Zuzana Liová
 The House (2013 film), a Chinese film directed by Yuan Li
 The House (2017 film), an American comedy film directed by Andrew J. Cohen
 The House (TV series), a 1996 BBC series about the Royal Opera House, London
 The House (2022 film), a three-part stop-motion anthology

In print
 The House, a 1926 novel by Richmal Crompton
 The House, 1944 book by Marjorie Hill Allee
 The House, 1997, by Bentley Little
 The House (novel), a 2006 novel by Danielle Steel
 The House (magazine), a magazine relating to the House of Commons of the United Kingdom
 The House, a 2009 children's book written by J. Patrick Lewis and illustrated by Roberto Innocenti

Other uses in arts and entertainment
 The House (Katie Melua album), 2010
 The House (Porches album), 2018
 The House (radio program), a political radio programme in Canada
 The House, a palace-city surrounded by The Garden in the fantasy series The Claidi Journals
 The House (The Keys to the Kingdom), the primary setting of a Garth Nix fantasy series

Other uses
 The House (trees), a group of monumental Giant Sequoias in Sequoia National Park, California
 House (legislature), in various countries
 The House (restaurant), Michelin starred restaurant in Ireland
 A casino, in the context of a gamble for which it sets the terms
 Christ Church, Oxford, a college nicknamed "The House"
 Random House, a publishing company nicknamed "The House"

See also
 House (disambiguation)